The U.S. Open Badminton Championships is an annual badminton tournament first held in  when the American Badminton Association (now USA Badminton) opened the U.S. National Badminton Championships to foreign competition. During the 1950s and 1960s it often attracted the world's top players.  The 2015 Yonex Suffolk County Community College US Open Championships, held in Brentwood, NY, attracted Malaysia's superstar Lee Chong Wei as well as 9 others in the top 30 MS competitors. In 2016, the tournament was hosted in El Monte, California. In 2017, the tournament was hosted in Anaheim, California. In 2018, the tournament will be held at California State University, Fullerton.

Past winners

Performances by nation

References

External links
Hickoksports.com: U.S. Open Badminton Champions

 
Badminton tournaments in the United States
1954 establishments in the United States
Recurring sporting events established in 1954